The World History Association Bentley Book Prize is an annual award given by the World History Association.  It was first awarded in 1999 as the World History Association Book Prize; the name was changed in 2012 to honor Jerry H. Bentley. The prize is $500. 

It should not be confused with the Jerry Bentley Prize in World History, a similar book prize established in 2014 by the American Historical Association.

Winners
Past winners:
 1999: Andre Gunder Frank, Re-Orient: Global Economy in the Asian Age
 2000: James McClellan III and Harold Dorn, Science and Technology in World History: An Introduction
 2001: (co-winners)
 John Robert McNeill, Something New under the Sun: An Environmental History of The Twentieth Century World
 Kenneth Pomeranz, The Great Divergence: China, Europe, and the Making of the Modern World Economy
 2002: Mike Davis, Late Victorian Holocausts: El Niño Famines and the Making of the Third World
 2003: Lauren Benton, Law and Colonial Cultures: Legal Regimes in World History, 1400-1900
 2004: Victor Lieberman, Strange Parallels: Southeast Asia in Global Context, c. 800 – 1830, Vol. I: “Integration on the Mainland”
 2005: David Christian, Maps of Time: An Introduction to Big History
 2006: No prize
 2007: Felipe Fernández-Armesto, Pathfinders: A Global History of Exploration
 2008: Stuart Banner, Possessing the Pacific Land, Settlers, and Indigenous People from Australia to Alaska 
 2009: (co-winners)
 Adam McKeown, Melancholy Order: Asian Migration and the Globalization of Borders, 1834-1929
 Joachim Radkau, Nature and Power:  A Global History of the Environment
 2010: John Chavez, Beyond Nations: Evolving Homelands in the North Atlantic World
 2011: Jane Burbank and Frederick Cooper, Empires in World History: Power and the Politics of Difference   
 2012: Prasannan Parthasarathi, Why Europe Grew Rich and Asia Did Not: Global Economic Divergence, 1600-1850 
 2013: (co-winners)
 Carl Nightingale, Segregation: A Global History of Divided Cities
 John K. Thornton, A Cultural History of the Atlantic World 1250-1820
 2014: Giorgio Riello, Cotton: The Fabric that Made the Modern World
 2015: Alfred J. Rieber, The Struggle for The Eurasian Borderlands: From the Rise of Early Modern Empires to the End of the First World War
 2016: Robert DuPlessis, Material Atlantic: Clothing, Commerce and Colonization in the Atlantic World, 1650 – 1800
 2017: (co-winners)
 Jonathan Eacott, Selling Empire: India Goods in the Making of Britain and America, 1600 – 1730
 Kiran Klaus Patel, The New Deal: A Global History
 2018: (co-winners)
 Fahad Ahmad Bishara, A Sea of Debt: Law and Economic Life in the Western Indian Ocean, 1780-1950
 Lorelle Semley, To be Free and French: Citizenship in France’s Atlantic Empire
 2019: Edward Rugemer, Slave Law and the Politics of Resistance in the Early Atlantic World 
 2020: Alan Strathern, Unearthly Powers: Religious and Political Change in World History 
 2021: (co-winners)
 Gijs Mom, Globalizing Automobilism: Exuberance and the Emergence of Layered Mobility, 1900 – 1980
 Mira Siegelberg, Statelessness: A Modern History
 2022: (co-winners)
 Melissa Macauley, Distant Shores: Colonial Encounters on China’s Maritime Frontier (Princeton University Press)
 Sujit Sivasundaram, Waves Across the South: A New History of Revolution and Empire (University of Chicago Press)

See also

 List of history awards

References

External links
 World History Association Book Prize, official website.

Awards established in 1999
American literary awards
History awards